George Wiley Sherburn (1884 – 28 November 1962) was an American scholar of eighteenth-century English literature. He was a specialist of Alexander Pope. He was an English professor at Harvard University and chairman of the Harvard English Department from 1945 to 1947.

References 

1884 births
1962 deaths
Harvard University faculty
Corresponding Fellows of the British Academy
American academics of English literature
Fellows of the American Academy of Arts and Sciences
Wesleyan University alumni
University of Chicago alumni
Columbia University faculty
Presidents of the Modern Language Association